Jake Bennett (born December 2, 2000) is an American baseball pitcher in the Washington Nationals organization.

Early life and amateur career
Bennett grew up in Bixby, Oklahoma and attended Bixby High School. He was selected in the 39th round of the 2019 MLB Draft by the Washington Nationals, but did not sign with the team.

Bennet went 3-0 with 0.75 ERA in three starts during his true freshman season before it was cut short due to the coronavirus pandemic. As a redshirt freshman, he had a 4-3 record with a 6.34 ERA and 60 strikeouts in 16 appearances with 13 starts. Bennett was named the Sooners' Friday night starter going into his redshirt sophomore season. He finished the season with a 10-4 record and a 3.69 ERA and 133 strikeouts against 22 walks over 20 appearances with 19 starts.

Professional career
Bennett was selected in the second round of 2022 Major League Baseball draft by the Washington Nationals. He signed with the team and received a $1,734,800 signing bonus.

References

External links

Oklahoma Sooners bio

2000 births
Living people
Baseball players from Oklahoma
Baseball pitchers
Oklahoma Sooners baseball players